Kodema is a village in Bakhmut Raion (district) in Donetsk Oblast of eastern Ukraine, at about  northeast by north from the centre of Donetsk city.

The village came under attack by Russian forces in 2022, during the Russian invasion of Ukraine.

References

External links

Villages in Bakhmut Raion